Strategic Ohio Council for Higher Education (SOCHE), renamed in 2021 from the Southwestern Ohio Council for Higher Education, was formed in 1967.  SOCHE is a regional consortium of colleges, universities, and businesses advancing higher education through academic collaboration, corporate and community partnerships, and student success.

History

In January 1967, ten presidents of institutions in the Dayton/Miami Valley area met to discuss collaborative efforts in education and research. Those institutions involved became the founding members of the Dayton-Miami Valley Consortium.

In March 1967, the presidents received a federal grant of $50,000 to develop the Consortium.

In November 1967, the Dayton-Miami Valley Consortium was officially incorporated by the State of Ohio.

In 1984, the Board of Trustees officially changed the name from Dayton-Miami Valley Consortium to the Southwestern Ohio Council for Higher Education. The motivation for this change was the intention to invite members to join the Consortium from a wider region.

In 2021, the organization again changed its name, to Strategic Ohio Council for Higher Education, to better reflect the mission and expanding services that extend beyond Southwestern Ohio.

Member colleges and universities
SOCHE is a consortium of twenty-two member institutions, being:
 Air Force Institute of Technology
 Antioch College
 Antioch University
 Cedarville University
 Central State University
 Cincinnati State Technical and Community College
 Clark State College
 Edison State Community College
 Franklin University
 Kettering College
 Kettering Foundation
 Miami University
 Ohio University
 Sinclair Community College
 Southern State Community College
 Union Institute & University
 University of Cincinnati
 University of Dayton
 Wilberforce University
 Wilmington College
 Wittenberg University
 Wright State University

Programs
Student Research Program provides research internships for approximately 90 undergraduate and graduate science and engineering students at Wright-Patterson Air Force Base in the Materials and Manufacturing Directorate and the Air Force Institute of Technology. With an $8.5 million award from the U.S. Air Force to the Southwestern Ohio Council for Higher Education's (SOCHE) Student Research Program, area colleges and universities will continue to produce undergraduate and graduate student research internships.

Degree Finder is a comprehensive listing of over 700 majors available at SOCHE member colleges and universities.

Partnership
Midwestern Higher Education Compact

External links
 SOCHE Web site

References

Universities and colleges in Ohio
Education in Dayton, Ohio
1967 establishments in Ohio